Mynydd Troed is a hill in the Black Mountains of the Brecon Beacons National Park in Powys, south Wales.  Its name literally translates to "Foot Mountain," based how it appears when viewed from the Allt Mawr ridge.

Geology
The base of the hill is formed from mudstones of the St Maughans Formation whilst the upper part is formed from the sandstones and mudstones of the Senni Beds Formation, both of which are assigned to the Old Red Sandstone laid down during the Devonian period. A few old landslides scar its slopes, a couple of which are seen to advantage from Castell Dinas and the ridge of Y Grib to the east. A number of small quarries have been worked on its slopes in the past.

Access

Other than its lower slopes, the hill is designated as open country and therefore freely accessible to walkers. The most popular routes of ascent are from Pengenffordd on the A479 to the northeast and from the col over which the minor road up Cwm Sorgwm goes towards Llangors. A bridleway and a restricted byway run around the foot of the hill to the north and west.

References

External links
 images of Mynydd Troed and surrounding area on Geograph website

Black Mountains, Wales
Mountains and hills of Powys
Marilyns of Wales
Talgarth